OpenBoard is a free and open source keyboard based on AOSP for Android devices.

It does not contain shortcuts to any Google apps and does not connect to Google servers.  OpenBoard is licensed under GNU General Public License v3.0.

Features 
OpenBoard is a privacy focused keyboard. It supports spell checking, text corrections and suggestions.  It supports "force incognito mode" to disable the learning of new words, and Clipboard history, delete-key swipe actions.

References 

Software using the GPL license